"She's Strange" is a 1984 single by the R&B/funk band, Cameo released in 1984. It is the title track from their tenth album. The single was their first to top the R&B chart, hitting number one for four weeks in April 1984. The single was the band's first to reach the Billboard Hot 100 pop chart, peaking at number forty-seven. 
The video was directed by Dieter 'Dee' Trattmann.

Charts

Weekly charts

Year-end charts

See also
List of number-one R&B singles of 1984 (U.S.)

References

1984 singles
Cameo (band) songs
1984 songs
Songs written by Larry Blackmon